The Asiatic Society of Japan, Inc. (一般社団法人日本アジア協会” or “Ippan Shadan Hojin Nihon Ajia Kyokai”) or "ASJ" is a non-profit organization of Japanology. ASJ serves members of a general audience that have shared interests in Japan.

The Honorary Patron is Hisako, Princess Takamado. The Representative Director and President as of September 2019 is H.E. Ambassador Yoshinori Kato.

Overview
The Asiatic Society of Japan's founders set into motion coordinated activities "to collect and publish information on subjects relating to Japan and other Asiatic Countries." They intentionally differentiated ASJ from its  affiliated Royal Asiatic societies of the day by having established ASJ as a "Society for scholarly gentlemen" rather than a society of scholars. Nor was "Royal" to be used in ASJ's title, a measure to encourage Japanese people to join. Women also began to join within a few years. ASJ quickly became the first organization of its kind in Japan to promote the sharing of discoveries about Japan to the rest of the world.

ASJ was founded at a meeting held on 8 October 1872 at the Grand Hotel, Yokohama, when Robert Grant Watson of the British Legation was elected the first President, and the first papers were read there on 30 October—Notes on Loochoo by Ernest Mason Satow, then Japanese Secretary at the British Legation, and The Hyalonema Mirabilis, a marine biological study by Henry Hadlow, a Royal Navy surgeon. The opening papers were significant for two reasons: the subjects themselves, and the presence of Dr. James Curtis Hepburn and Satow at the very beginning of the ASJ's life.

ASJ's founders and earliest members were adventurous leaders who became pillars of Japan's modernization and industrialization at the dawn of Meiji Period. Physicians, scientists, teachers, engineers, military officers, lawyers, and diplomats numbered among them. In those days, there were numerous organizations like ASJ, each in their own way serving as focal points for documenting and discussing the discoveries that were being made by the men who were participating in the building of a new Japan. Many members of ASJ were also members of the other organizations.

Japanese members who were central to the Meiji Restoration included: Kanō Jigorō, Baron Naibu Kanda, Tsuda Sen, Nakamura Masanao, and Viscount Mori Arinori.

The 'foreign expert' group was, likewise, a roster of the famous: Dr. James Curtis Hepburn; Josiah Conder;  John Milne, Edward Divers, James Main Dixon and Charles Dickinson West, all of the Imperial College of Engineering; Henry Faulds of the Tsukiji Hospital; Robert Maclagan of the Osaka Mint; Basil Hall Chamberlain; and  William George Aston and  Ernest Mason Satow.

ASJ, embracing a core of pioneers with the self-imposed task of interpreting the Japanese and their civilization to the rest of the world, played a highly significant part in transmitting new standards of critical and technical excellence to a whole generation of Japanese teachers and students, which, once adopted, made the 'foreign experts' superfluous. By the 1890s, ASJ's first generation of Japanese and foreign members—leaders of change in Meiji—began to move on. Academicians began to make-up more of the membership. Today, the membership is approximately: academicians (46%); businesspeople (36%); students, fine arts, clergy, retired and other (18%).

ASJ is still active today. Members meet monthly to hear a guest explain discoveries based on original research. The lectures last approximately fifty minutes and are followed by questions and discussion. Topics have come from the full spectrum of fields of knowledge as related to Japan, including culture, history, literature, science, business, politics, and economics.

Publications

The Transactions of the Asiatic Society of Japan is a journal that contains the full texts of selected papers presented at meetings, as well as other papers submitted for publication. The ASJ also publishes a monthly newsletter known as the Bulletin, which contains a detailed summary of the previous month's lecture, lecturers' profiles, announcements of coming events, and news about the ASJ and its members.

For most of the ASJ's history, there has been no limit to the range of interests covered in the pursuit of the objective. The first ten volumes of the Society's Transactions, 1872-1882, printed 146 papers, of which 25 can be roughly classified as geographical or topographical. They are, however, far outnumbered by the largest subject grouping: the scientific papers during the same period, which included 52 studies. But to take the figures further, during the second decade, 1882-1892, 107 papers were printed, of which only 4 were geographical and 18 scientific, a reflection of the end of the 'exploration' phase of Meiji. The men who contributed to the exploration phase and to the explosive growth of the ASJ during its first 20 years began to wind-up their activities and move to their next opportunities.

On the occasion of the 110th Anniversary of the ASJ, after having completed his historical account of the first one-hundred years of the ASJ, President Douglas Moore Kenrick remarked to Their Imperial Highnesses and members present:

Early Presidents 
Presidents of the organization during the 19th century:

 1872–1873: Robert Grant Watson
 1873–1874: Dr James Curtis Hepburn
 1874–1876: Samuel Robbins Brown
 1876–1878: Harry Smith Parkes
 1878–1879: David Murray
 1879–1880: Edward W. Syle
 1880–1881: Edward Divers, FRS
 1881–1882: J Gordon Kenney
 1882–1883: Sir Harry Smith Parkes
 1883–1885: James Curtis Hepburn
 1885–1888: Nicholas John Hannen
 1888–1889: William George Aston
 1889–1890: Rev James Lansing Amerman
 1890–1891: Nicholas John Hannen
 1891–1893: Prof. Basil Hall Chamberlain
 1893–1895: Rev Daniel Crosby Greene
 1895–1900: Sir Ernest Mason Satow

Notable members 
In addition to the early presidents, other members who joined during the first 111 years (1872–1983) of the organization include:

 Masaharu Anesaki
 Mori Arinori
 Josiah Conder
 Hugh Cortazzi
James Main Dixon
Henry Faulds
 John Harington Gubbins
Kanō Jigorō
 Lafcadio Hearn
Baron Naibu Kanda
 Donald Keene
 Neal Lawrence
Robert Maclagan
John Milne
Masanao Nakamura
 Edwin O. Reischauer
 Donald Richie
 Edward Seidensticker
Tsuda Sen
Charles Dickinson West

References

External links
  

Japanese studies
Organizations established in 1872
Meiji Restoration
1872 establishments in Japan